Saint Folcwin (Old Dutch: *Folkwin; French : Folquin, date of birth unknown, died 855 AD in Esquelbecq) was a Frankish abbot, cleric and Bishop of Thérouanne (appointed 816). He was a contemporary of Notker of Liege.

He is venerated in the Roman Catholic Church and Eastern Orthodox Church on 14 December.

The first part of the Latin cartulary of St Bertin's is credited to St Folquin. A review of his life was written during the next century by his grand nephew Folcuin, abbot of Lobbes, on request of Walter, abbot of Saint-Bertin.

See also 
 Saint-Folquin, a commune in the Pas-de-Calais department in the Hauts-de-France region of France named for the 9th-century Christian saint.

References 

Christian saints
855 deaths